The West Butte Fire (also called the Sutter North Fire) was a wildfire that burned near Colusa, California in Sutter County in the United States. The fire started on June 8, 2019 and was contained on June 10, 2019. The cause of the fire remains under investigation.

Fire

The West Butte Fire was reported at 5:44 PM on June 8, 2019 at North Butte Road and West Butte Road, north of Sutter Buttes and northeast of Colusa in Sutter County, California. The fire was reported contained by that evening.

References

2019 California wildfires
June 2019 events in the United States
Wildfires in Sutter County, California